The Jonker diamond was found at the Elandsfontein mine in South Africa by Johannes Jacobus Jonker on 17 January 1934. The diamond was 726 carats, which at the time was the fourth largest uncut gem ever found.

Discovery
The diamond was discovered by South African farmer Johannes Jacobus Jonker on 17 January 1934.

The diamond was first purchased by Joseph Bastiaenen, an agent of the Diamond Corporation Ltd, a company owned by Sir Ernest Oppenheimer. In 1935 it was purchased by Harry Winston, a New York diamond dealer, for 150,000 pounds. Harry Winston toured the United States with the diamond that was photographed with a number of stars such as Claudette Colbert and Shirley Temple.

Cut
After contemplating the diamond for almost a year, Winston chose Lazare Kaplan to study the Jonker diamond.

Lazare Kaplan was chosen to cut the diamond into several gemstones. The process of examining the diamond to determine the optimal cuts took place over the course of several months. On 27 April 1936, the first cut was made which cut off a 35-carat section, finally ending with the diamond being cut into 13 pieces. The largest piece produced the Jonker I, a 142.90 ct D-color flawless diamond which was later re-cut to 125.35 carats.

Jonker I
In 1949 King Farouk of Egypt purchased the Jonker I, but after he was deposed and exiled in 1952 the gem was lost. After a number of years the gem reappeared in the ownership of Queen Ratna of Nepal. The last known location of the Jonker I was in Hong Kong in 1977 when it was sold to an anonymous buyer for $2,259,000.

See also
List of diamonds
List of largest rough diamonds

Further reading 

Shipley, Robert M. (1935). Jonker Diamond in U.S., pp.  3. Gemological Institute of America, USA, Vol. 1, No. 9 (May–June)
Kaplan, Lazare (1936). Cleaving the Jonker Diamond, pp.  11–12. Gemological Institute of America, USA, Vol. 2, No. 2 (Summer 1936)
Shipley, Robert M. (1937). Important Diamonds of the World, pp.  7–8. Gemological Institute of America, USA, Vol. 2, No. 6 (Summer 1937)

References 

1934 in South Africa
Diamonds originating in South Africa
Individual diamonds